L3Harris Technologies, Inc. is an American technology company, defense contractor, and information technology services provider that produces C6ISR systems and products, wireless equipment, tactical radios, avionics and electronic systems, night vision equipment, and both terrestrial and spaceborne antennas for use in the government, defense, and commercial sectors. They specialize in surveillance solutions, microwave weaponry, and electronic warfare. It was formed from the merger of L3 Technologies (formerly L-3 Communications) and Harris Corporation on June 29, 2019, and was expected to be the sixth-largest defense contractor in the United States.

History 

The "Harris Automatic Press Company" was founded by Alfred S. Harris in Niles, Ohio, in 1895. The company spent the next 60 years developing lithographic processes and printing presses before acquiring typesetting company Intertype Corporation. In 1967, they merged with Radiation, Inc. of Melbourne, Florida, a developer of antenna, integrated circuit, and modem technology used in the space race. The company headquarters was moved from Cleveland to Melbourne in 1978. On May 29, 2015, Harris finalized the purchase of competitor Exelis Inc., almost doubling the size of the original company.

L-3 Communications was formed in 1997 to acquire certain business units from Lockheed Martin that had previously been part of Loral Corporation. These units had belonged to Lockheed Corporation and Martin Marietta, which had merged three years before in 1993.  The company was founded by (and named for) Frank Lanza and Robert LaPenta in partnership with Lehman Brothers. Lanza and LaPenta had both served as executives at Loral and Lockheed. The company continued to expand through mergers and acquisitions to become one of the top ten U.S. government contractors. At the end of 2016, the company changed its name from L-3 Communications Holdings, Inc. to L3 Technologies, Inc. to better reflect the company's wider focus since its founding in 1997.

In October 2018, Harris and L3 announced an all-stock "merger of equals". As part of that deal, Harris was required to sell its night vision division; the reasoning was that a merger of Harris and L3's night vision departments would create an effective monopoly on the night vision industry. The merger was completed on June 29, 2019, and the new company, L3Harris Technologies, Inc., is based in Melbourne, Florida, where Harris was headquartered. The new company was led by former Harris CEO William M. Brown as the Chairman and CEO, with former L3 CEO as the President and COO. On June 29, 2021, Brown turned over the role of CEO to Chris Kubasik, retaining the title of Executive Chair, and Kubasik adding the title of Vice Chair.

In 2018, L3Harris acquired two Australian cybertechnology companies, Azimuth Security and Linchpin Labs. The two companies are reportedly suppliers of zero-day exploits for the Five Eyes and the Federal Bureau of Investigation.

In 2019, L3Harris paid $13 million to settle allegations that Harris, before the merger, violated Arms Export Control Act  and International Traffic in Arms Regulations regulations. According to a proposed charging letter  Harris Corporation violated AECA (22U.S.C.2751 et seq.) and ITAR (22 CFR parts 120–131) for a total of 131 separate violations.  

In January 2022, L3Harris reorganized its business structure, eliminating the Aviation Systems business segment and distributing its divisions between the remaining three Integrated Mission Systems, Space & Airborne Systems, and Communications Systems segments.

In June 2022, Chris Kubasik succeeded as the Chair following Bill Brown's retirement.

In June 2022, it was reported to have held talks to purchase the Israeli company NSO, which builds Pegasus spyware. White House officials heard of the talks and voiced opposition, resulting in L3Harris discontinuing its plans.

In December 2022, L3Harris agreed to buy Aerojet Rocketdyne Holdings for $4.7 billion in cash.

Business organization 
, L3Harris is organized under three business segments: Integrated Mission Systems, Space & Airborne Systems, and Communication Systems. It is led by a 13-member board of directors, including Chair and CEO Chris Kubasik.

Integrated Mission Systems 
Headquartered in Palm Bay, Florida, Integrated Missions Systems specializes in intelligence, surveillance, and reconnaissance (ISR) and signals intelligence systems; electrical and electronic systems for maritime use; electro-optical systems including infrared, laser imaging, and targeting systems; defense aviation systems including weapons systems and UAVs; and commercial aviation solutions, including avionics, collision avoidance systems, flight recorders, flight simulators, and pilot training. It comprises divisions, including some of those formerly in the Aviation Systems segment and Wescam, that had a combined revenue of $7.0 billion in 2021.

Space & Airborne Systems 
Headquartered in Palm Bay, Florida, Space & Airborne Systems specializes in space mission, payloads, and sensors for satellite navigation, ISR, weather, and missile defense; ground systems for space command and control and tracking; optical and wireless networking for situational awareness and air traffic management; defense avionics; and electronic warfare countermeasures. It comprises divisions, including some of those formerly in the Aviation Systems segment, that had a combined revenue of $6.0 billion in 2021.

Communications Systems 
Headquartered in Rochester, New York, Communications Systems specializes in tactical communications, broadband communications, night vision (inherited from L3 Technologies, unrelated to night vision developed by Harris, ITT, or Exelis), and public safety. It comprises divisions that had a combined revenue of $4.3 billion in 2021.

Products
 AVCATT, a mobile aviation training simulator
 StingRay and Hailstorm phone trackers.
 OpenSky wireless communication system
 TCAS, FDR & CVR products of the Aviation Communication & Surveillance Systems product line, serviced and managed by OEMServices
 hC2 L3Harris Command and Control Battle Management Suite—former "Harris Command and Control" 
 Integrated Core Processor, main computer in F-35 Lightning II and in C-130J Super Hercules
 GPNVG-18, a night vision device that utilises four night vision tubes to give the user a wider field of view
AN/PVS-31A BNVD and 1531 BNVD. Binocular articulating night vision devices. Standard issue goggle for US SOCOM.
Azimuth, technology enabling access to data from locked mobile phones. L3Harris acquired Azimuth in 2018 through an acquisition of an Australian company, Azimuth Security.

References

External links 
 

 
American companies established in 2019
Electronics companies of the United States
Defense companies of the United States
Multinational companies headquartered in the United States
Companies based in Brevard County, Florida
Manufacturing companies based in Florida
Melbourne, Florida
Electronics companies established in 2019
2019 establishments in Florida
Military equipment of the United States
Companies listed on the New York Stock Exchange
Avionics companies
Security equipment manufacturers